The Dragon Awards are a set of literary and media awards voted on by fandom and presented annually since 2016 by Dragon Con for excellence in various categories of science fiction, fantasy,  horror novels, movies, television, and games.

History
The Dragon Awards were first presented in 2016, created on the occasion of the 30th anniversary of Dragon Con to "recognize excellence in all things Science Fiction and Fantasy."  In 2018, 11,000 voters cast a ballot. They are given out annually at Dragon Con in Atlanta, Georgia.

The finalist shortlist for the first Dragon Awards was announced on August 11, 2016, and the winners were announced on September 4 that year.

A unique feature of the Awards is that it runs a diverse set of subgenera.

In 2017, nominated authors Allison Littlewood, John Scalzi, and N.K. Jemisin asked Dragon Con to remove their names from the ballot; John Scalzi shortly reconsidered and remained in the contest. However, the coordinators of the Dragon Awards initially refused to remove other authors' names from the running, which generated criticism across blogs and science fiction related publications, ultimately leading the organizers to comply with nominee wishes when they desire to abstain.

Nomination and voting processes
The nominations and votes are collected electronically. Participation is available to everyone, requiring only an e-mail address, but no membership or other fees, to vote. The Dragon Awards website states that they "[reserve] the right to invalidate suspect or questionable ballots without notice," and that "All decisions regarding the voting process and selection of winners shall be made by DRAGON CON in its sole discretion, shall be final, and shall not be subject to challenge or appeal." Language describing the review of nominations does not state that nominations are counted numerically but are "gathered and reviewed to create a final ballot." Neither counts of nominations nor votes have ever been made public.

The award process consists of two steps: 
a nomination step where each voter nominates one work of choice in each category.  The nominations  are "gathered and reviewed to create a final ballot." 
a voting step where the finalists selected from the nominated works are voted on by each voter.

Reception
The Dragon Awards have been criticized because of the appearance that the awards were created in conjunction with campaigns by the Rabid and Sad Puppies to attack the Hugo Award. Another concern raised is regarding the opaqueness of the nomination and voting process.

Winners
The full list of nominees ("shortlist") can be found at List of Dragon Award nominees.

Best Science Fiction Novel

Best Fantasy Novel

Best Young Adult / Middle Grade Novel

Best Military Science Fiction or Fantasy Novel

Best Alternate History Novel

Best Apocalyptic Novel

The category "Best Apocalyptic Novel" was removed from the awards in 2018.

Best Media Tie-In Novel

The category "Best Media Tie-In Novel" was first introduced in 2018.

Best Horror Novel

Best Comic Book

Best Graphic Novel

Best Science Fiction or Fantasy TV Series

Best Science Fiction or Fantasy Movie

Best Science Fiction or Fantasy PC/Console Game

Best Science Fiction or Fantasy Mobile Game

Best Science Fiction or Fantasy Board Game

Best Science Fiction or Fantasy Miniatures / Collectible Card / Role-Playing Game

References

2016 establishments in the United States
Awards established in 2016
Board game awards
Fantasy awards
American fiction awards
American film awards
Game awards
Science fiction awards
American television awards
Video game awards
Comics awards